Jayanti or Jayanthi, a feminine Sanskrit word meaning "victorious", may refer to:

 Jayanti (Hinduism), a figure in Hindu mythology, a daughter of Indra
 Jayanti (film), a 2021 Indian Marathi-language film

Places
 Jayanti, Alipurduar, a village in Buxa Tiger Reserve, Alipurduar district, West Bengal, India
 Jayanti Devi Temple, Haryana, India
 Jayanti Stadium, Bhilai, India
 Jayanti, Indonesia, a subdistrict of Tangerang Regency, Banten, Indonesia

People

Given name
 Jayanthi (actress) (1945–2021), South Indian actress
 Princess Jayanti of Nepal (1946–2001), member of the Nepalese royal family
 Jayanthi Ballal (born 1972), Indian fashion entrepreneur and designer
 Jayanti Behera (born 1999), Indian track and field Paralympic athlete
 Jayanti Dalal (1909–1970), Indian author, publisher, film maker and politician
 Jayanthi Kumaresh (active from 1990), Indian veena musician
 Jayanthi Kuru-Utumpala (born 1979), first Sri Lankan to summit Mount Everest
 Jayanthi Kyle (born ), American gospel and soul singer
 Jayanti Naik (born 1962), Indian writer and folklorist
 Jayanthi Natarajan (born 1954), Indian lawyer and politician
 Jayanti Patel (1924–2019), Indian actor, playwright and yogi
 Jayanti Patnaik (1932–2022), Indian politician
 Jayanti Devi Rai (fl. 2020s), deputy chairperson of the Communist Party of Nepal (Unified Socialist)
 Jayanti Tamm, author of the 2009 memoir Cartwheels in a Sari

Surname
 Aruna Jayanthi (born before 1984), Indian businesswoman
 Dandeniya Gamage Jayanthi (active from 1989), Sri Lankan political activist
 Kimmy Jayanti (born 1991), Indonesian model and actress 
 Vikram Jayanti (born 1955), American documentary filmmaker

See also
 Jayant (disambiguation), masculine version of the word